Ojo is a local government area and town

in Lagos State, Nigeria. Lagos State University is located there.
Ojo is located on the eastern section of the Trans–West African Coastal Highway, about 37 km west of Lagos. It is part of the Lagos Metropolitan Area.

Ojo is a primarily residential township although it contains some major markets including Alaba International Market, Alaba livestock market (Alaba Rago), the old Lagos International Trade Fair complex, and Iyana-Iba market. It also houses the divisional headquarters of 81 division Nigerian Army and Navy Town.
South of the town (across Badagry creek), the rest of the local government is sparsely populated and consists of mangrove swamps and sandy beaches. Some of these beaches are holiday spots in the festive season. Wildlife mostly consists of reptiles, rodents and birds including crocodiles, iguanas, monitor lizards and squirrels. Whales and dolphins have been known to visit the coastal areas. Some towns there are Iba, Igando, Okokomaiko, and so on.

History
Oral tradition holds that Ojo was founded by Esugbemi, his wife Erelu and chief priest Osu who migrated from Ile-Ife to form a settlement named Ilufe. Esugbemi was a hunter who explored the swamp forests in the area which later became Ojo. During his expeditions he became convinced that he ought to expand the settlement. Osu consulted the Oracle which affirmed his decision at Ikemo quarters in present-day Olojo district.
The new town invited other Awori settlers from Iddo and Idumota who built Irewe Osolu, south of Otto-Awori.

The western (Oto-Awori) and northern (Iba and Igbo-elerin) parts of Ojo developed independently as a result of the settlement of later Awori migrants from Ile-Ife. The migrants first settled in Obadore in Iba before expanding towards the west and southwest. Oto-Awori was ruled by a baale until a King was first nominated. This was opposed by the oracle.
This led to the formation of Oto-Awori & Otto-Iddo.
Eventually, an Oba of Oto-Awori ascended the throne in the late 18th century to rule alongside the Olojo of Ojo.

Ojo local government was created in May 1989 under the military administration of General Ibrahim Babangida￼￼ as the president of Nigeria. The military governor of Lagos State then was Brigadier General Raji Rasaki. Before the creation of Ojo local government out of the old Badagry local government, the area was adjudged the most populous in the Federation going by the National Population Census conducted in Nigeria in 1991. The population of the area according to the 2006 census was 609,173: 315,401 male and 293,772 female. 62.3 percent was 15-64 years old, 36.3 percent was  0-14 years old, and 1.4 percent was 65 and over.

Transportation 
Transportation is mainly by road. The Trans–West African Coastal Highway runs east–west through the town and divides it into North and South halves. Olojo drive, Old Ojo road, Kemberi road and Alaba road are the main roads in the southern half of the town. In the northern half Chief Esan way, Iyana-Ipaja road, Igbo-elerin road are major roads.

Ojo is a peninsula and ferry services and speed boats are available through Badagry creek with jetties at Muwo, Shibiri and off Olojo drive. A rail line from Lagos through Ojo is under construction and it is expected to alleviate the perpetual traffic jams within the area.

Culture 
Ojo is known for the Olojo festival during which the Olojo wears the crown. Oro festivals are held at the death of the Olojo or a Baale. Oro has drawn controversy for elements of the festival which some consider to be misogynistic.
Other festivals include Egungun, Obaluwaye, Sango, Ogun, Ota and Osun which are named after deities or heroes which they celebrate. Iyemoja and Gelede and Alaalu are also celebrated in Otto-Awori district.

References

Local Government Areas in Lagos State
Populated coastal places in Nigeria
Local Government Areas in Yorubaland